The Order of Merit for Labour is an Italian order of chivalry that was founded in 1923 by King Vittorio Emanuele III. It is awarded to those "who have been singularly meritorious" in agriculture, industry and commerce, crafts, lending and insurance. It is a continuation of the earlier Ordine al Merito Agrario, Industriale e Commerciale founded in 1901.  Members of the order may use the title Cavaliere del lavoro.

The origins of the order lie with King Umberto I who, in 1898, instituted "a decoration for agricultural and industrial merit and a medal of honour." The first was the exclusive prerogative of large landowners and industrialists, the latter for their employees. This was replaced by the Chivalrous or Knightly Order of Agricultural, Industrial and Commercial Merit in 1901, which was intended by Vittorio Emanuele III to give greater dignity to the earlier award.

Awarded in the single degree of Knight, the order is open to all Italians, living at home and overseas. Every year, on 1 June, 25 new Knights of Labour are invested from a shortlist of 40 candidates. The related Star of Merit for Labour, established in 1923, confers the title of Maestro del Lavoro.

The order is bestowed by decree of the President of the Italian Republic, its head since 1952, on the recommendation of the Minister of Economic Development (successor to the Minister of Industry, Commerce and Craftsmanship). The badge bears the inscription Al merito del lavoro—1901; the V.E. monogram formerly at the centre of the Greek cross, now substituted for the national coat of arms.

In 1977, the future four-time President of the Council of Ministers, Silvio Berlusconi, was appointed to the order by the sixth President of Republic, Giovanni Leone. He later renounced the title after he was found guilty of tax fraud.

See also 
 List of Italian orders of knighthood
 Order of Merit of the Italian Republic

References

External links 

 Presidenza della Repubblica - Le Onorificenze 
  Ordini dinastici della Real Casa di Savoia 

Labour, Order of Merit for
Labour, Order of Merit for
1923 establishments in Italy